Gjilan is the eighth largest city in Kosovo and seat of Gjilan Municipality and Gjilan District.

Name 

Ottoman chronicler Evliya Çelebi mentions Morava as a settlement of the Sanjak of Vučitrn. Çelebi writes that: "The seventeen day journey from Constantinople (Istanbul) to pass through Vranje, Novo Brdo, Kriva Reka (Egridere) and Morava (Gjilan). The etymology of Gjilan is disputed. Albanian sources claim that the town (initially a village) obtained its name from Bahti Beg Gjinolli of Gjinaj clan that ruled the region of Vushtrri (Llap and Drenica), and populated this area in the 18th century (around 1750).

History 

In 1342, a place called Morava was visited by Serbian King Stefan Dušan (later Emperor, r. 1331–1355). A fort was built nearby in the 14th century. Gornja Morava ("Upper Morava") was known as simply Morava under Ottoman rule, and it extended west of the Upper Žegra–Budriga–Cernica line, thus Gjilan stayed in the oblast (province) of Topolnica, which provincial seat was Novo Brdo.  In the 1455 defter (Ottoman tax registry), Gjilan was inhabited by Serbs, and the priest Božidar served the town. There were 41 households. The defter is deemed highly unreliable in the modern day and age due to its religious and not ethnic registration of people. Haji Kalfa (first half of the 17th century) mentions Morava being 17 days from Constantinople. Gornja Morava and Izmornik were organized into the Sanjak of Vučitrn up until the 18th century. Gjilan became a kadiluk around 1780, and 20–25 years later a large village.

The exact year of establishment of Gjilan to this day is not exactly determined. In the 17th century, Evlia Çelebija mentions Gjilan, but named Morava, as a cadillac within the Sanjak of Vučitrn. Among other things, Evlia Çelebija writes that "Seventeen days the road from Constantinople (today's Istanbul) to Novo Brdo passes through Vranje, Kriva Reka (Egridere) of Morava (Gjilan)". There is a tradition in the people that Gjilan as a settlement was formed around 1750, and as an urban center – in 1772. Gjilan as a town developed in addition to the extinction of Novo Brdo, which in the Middle Ages was one of the cities and the largest commercial, economic and mining centers in the Balkans. The feudal family "Gjinaj" in the second half of the nineteenth century transferred their headquarters from Novo Brdo and built their own houses in the place where Gjilani is now located.

Modern history 

In 1999, Camp Monteith was established outside the city as a base of operations for KFOR during Operation Joint Guardian, on the site of a destroyed Serbian military base which was handed over to the Kosovo Protection Corps in 2007 after the U.S. Military downsized their number of troops. Gjilan has also served as the regional headquarters of the UNMIK International Police task force from 1999.

In the aftermath of the Kosovo War, the town's Kosovo Serb civilians were abducted, tortured and killed by members of the Kosovo Liberation Army's "Gnjilane Group". They kidnapped 159 Serb civilians and killed between 51 and 80 of them from June to October 1999.

Geography 

Gjilan is located in the southeastern part of Kosovo, the region of Anamorava. Its geographic position makes it possible to make good connections with other centers of Kosovo and the region. Around the town of Gjilan lis the Hill of Martyrs (Popovica), Gllama, Dheu i Bardhë, the area of Malisheva (Gjilan), Zabeli of Sahit Agës and Bregu i Thatë. There are three small rivers, Mirusha, Banja and Stanishori, which join and flow to Binačka Morava, west of the Uglara village.

Gjilan is 46 km from Pristina, 27 km from Kamenica, 22 km from Vitina, and 25 km from Novo Brdo. The municipalities of the region are bordered in the southeast by Preševo (33 km) and Kumanovo (53 km), and in the east by Bujanovac (40 km).

The Gjilan area is defined by the Morava River, which collects all the small rivers, with an average monthly flow rate of 6.7 cubic meters/second. In the southeast it is surrounded by the mountains of Karadak.

Climate 

Economy 

As of 2018 there were 4,100 registered private businesses in the municipality employing some 6,900 people.

Prior to 1999, Gjilan was an important industrial centre in Kosovo. Still in operation are the radiator factory and tobacco factory, which has been recently privatized. The new city business incubator, supported by the European Agency for Reconstruction, was inaugurated in the summer of 2007.

Infrastructure

Education 

Education in Gjilan includes pre-school, primary and secondary education, and a public university (Kadri Zeka). As of 2018, there were 12,370 students in 29 primary schools, of which 12,023 were ethnic Albanians and 347 members of ethnic minorities (Serbs, Roma and Turks). There were nine secondary schools with 5,650 students of which 5,449 were Albanians and the rest minority groups.

Demography 

The population of Gjilan has always been mixed, but with a predominant majority of Albanians in both periods during Turkish and Serbian-Yugoslav rule. According to the 2011 census, the Municipality of Gjilan has 90,178 inhabitants. Albanians – 87,814, Serbs – 624, Turks – 978, Bosniaks – 121, Roma – 361, Ashkali – 15, Gorani – 69, Egyptians – 1, others – 95. They preferred not to respond – 35 people.
In the city live 54,239 inhabitants, while in rural areas – 35,939.
Division of population by gender: male – 45,354, female – 44,824. Based on the population estimates from the Kosovo Agency of Statistics in 2016, the municipality has 81,447 inhabitants.

The vast majority of the population is Albanian, followed by Serbs, and a small number of minorities. There are among others, 978 Turks or 1% of the municipal population. The recorded number of Serbs has decreased due to partial census boycott and the creation of the Serb-majority municipality of Parteš.

The ethnic composition of the municipality:

Albanian, Serbian and Turkish are all official languages in the municipality.

Culture

Flaka e Janarit

Flaka e Janarit is a cultural event that starts on January 11 in Gjilan with a symbolic opening of the flame, to keep up with various cultural activities to 31 January of each year. It gathers thousands of artists and art lovers from all the Albanian territories, who for three consecutive weeks transform the city into a cultural metropolis. The nation's martyrs are honored through values of art by this event, which began before the 10th anniversary of the assassination of writer, activist and patriot Jusuf Gërvalla, along with Kadri Zeka and Bardhosh Gërvalla.  It was exactly the tenth anniversary without these three martyrs of freedom and from coincidence of these murders in a same date on 11 January, this event got this name "Flaka e Janarit".

There are 41 mosques in Gjilan.

Sports 

Gjilan is home to the basketball club KB Drita, the football clubs SC Gjilani and FC Drita and the volleyball club KV Drita, male and female competition the most successful club in Gjilan's history. It also has the football club which is in the 2nd league KF Bashkimi from Koretin, a village in Gjilan.

Gjilan hosts the biggest derby in Kosovo, the Kosovo Derby, between FC Drita and SC Gjilani. Both of the clubs are from the city, which draw thousands of viewers inside the Gjilan City Stadium.

Gallery

Notable people 

Idriz Seferi (b.1847), Albanian patriot
Mulla Idriz Gjilani (b.1901), Albanian patriot
Zoran Antić (b. 1975), Serbian footballer
Faton Bislimi (b. 1983), Kosovan author
Nijazi Ramadani (b. 1964), Kosovan poetry writer
Albert Bunjaku (b. 1983), Swiss footballer
Daut Dauti (b. 1960) Kosovan author
Dragan Dimić, Serbian footballer
Bajram Haliti (b. 1955), Romani writer
Shpëtim Hasani (b. 1982), Kosovan footballer
Lutfi Haziri (b. 1969), Kosovan politician
Genta Ismajli (b. 1985), Kosovan singer
Ismet Munishi (b. 1974), Kosovan footballer
Aljmir Murati (b. 1985), Swiss footballer
Zenun Pajaziti (b. 1966), Kosovan politician
Xherdan Shaqiri (b. 1991), Swiss footballer
Jahi Jahiu, (b. 1959), Kosovan artist
Mira Stupica (b. 1923), Serbian actress
Goran Svilanović (b. 1963), Serbian politician
Faton Toski (b. 1987), German footballer
Agim Ramadani (b. 1963), KLA commander
Abdullah Tahiri (b. 1956), KLA commander
Antun Marković (b. 1992), Croatian footballer
Lirim Hajrullahu (b. 1990), Canadian CFL kicker

International relations 

Gjilan is twinned with:
  Kumanovo, North Macedonia
  Nazilli, Turkey

Notes

References

External links 

Municipality of GjilanOfficial Website

 
Gjilan
Gjilan